Fivehead Arable Fields is a 10.3 hectare (25.4 acre) biological Site of Special Scientific Interest near the village of Fivehead in Somerset, notified in 1990.

This site has one of the most important assemblages of arable weeds in Britain, several of which are now nationally rare or scarce. There is a large population of the nationally rare Broad-fruited Cornsalad (Valerianella rimosa).

References

External links 
Fivehead Arable Fields from Somerset Wildlife Trust

Sites of Special Scientific Interest in Somerset
Sites of Special Scientific Interest notified in 1990